Chris Peers (born 3 March 1970 in Deinze) is a Belgian former professional cyclist.

Major results

1988
 1st  Junior National Road Race Championships
1991
 1st Stages 2 & 6 Tour de Wallonie
 2nd Vlaamse Pijl
1994
 3rd Nokere Koerse
1996
 1st Grote Prijs Stad Zottegem
1998
 2nd Grote Prijs Stad Zottegem
 3rd Nokere Koerse
1999
 2nd Grand Prix de la Ville de Lillers
 2nd Veenendaal–Veenendaal
 3rd Dwars door Vlaanderen
2000 
 2nd Grand Prix d'Isbergues
 2nd Paris–Bourges
 3rd Kampioenschap van Vlaanderen
 3rd E3 Harelbeke
 3rd Étoile de Bessèges
 5th Gent–Wevelgem
2001
 1st Overall Circuit Franco-Belge
1st Stage 1
 2nd Grand Prix d'Isbergues
 6th Tour of Flanders
 7th Gent–Wevelgem
 9th Paris–Roubaix
 10th Amstel Gold Race
2002
 3rd Brabantse Pijl
2003
 1st Omloop van de Vlaamse Scheldeboorden

References

1970 births
Living people
Belgian male cyclists
People from Deinze
Cyclists from East Flanders